Monica Mondardini (Cesena, 26 September 1960) is an Italian emanager, currently Chief Executive Officer of the CIR Group (Compagnie Industriali Riunite) and of its subsidiary Gruppo Editoriale L'Espresso.

Biography 
A graduate in Statistical and Economic Sciences from the University of Bologna, she began her managerial career in the publishing sector in 1985 in the Fabbri Group, taking part in an international development project. In 1990 she joined Hachette (Lagardère group) as Director of the Spanish branch of Hachette Livre; subsequently she was appointed Director of the international branch with headquarters in Paris and also became a member of the Executive Committee of Hachette Livre.

In 1998 she joined the Assicurazioni Generali group as Chief Executive Officer of Europ Assistance in Paris. Two years later she returned to Italy to head up the Planning and Control Service of the general management of Generali in Trieste. In 2001 she moved to Madrid to take up the position of chief executive of Generali España.

On December 1, 2008 she became Chief Executive Officer of Gruppo Editoriale L'Espresso, one of the main publishing groups in Italy. Under her leadership, despite the difficult economic situation in the sector, Espresso is one of the few publishing houses in Italy to be profitable. 
On May 20, 2010 she was elected to the Board of the French bank Crédit Agricole.
In 2012 she was appointed Chief Executive Officer of CIR Group (Compagnie Industriali Riunite), the holding company that controls Gruppo Editoriale L’Espresso, Sogefi and KOS. In 2015 she became Chairman of Sogefi.

Other activities 
 Atlantia, Member of the Board of Directors
 Hera Group, Non-Executive Independent Member of the Board of Directors

Honours 
In 2014 she received the Italian personality of the year award from the French Embassy and Chamber of Commerce in Italy.
 The 12 May 2016 she received the Legion of Honour of the French Republic

References

External links 

 
 gruppoespresso.it

1960 births
Living people
Italian businesspeople